ERB-196, also known as WAY-202196, is a synthetic nonsteroidal estrogen that acts as a highly selective agonist of the ERβ. It possesses 78-fold selectivity for the ERβ over the ERα. The drug was under development by Wyeth for the treatment of inflammation and sepsis starting in 2004 but development was discontinued by 2011.

See also
 8β-VE2
 Diarylpropionitrile
 FERb 033
 Prinaberel
 WAY-166818
 WAY-200070
 WAY-214156

References

External links
 ERB-196 - AdisInsight

Phenols
Fluoroarenes
Naphthalenes
Nitriles
Selective ERβ agonists
Synthetic estrogens